Rear-Admiral Fred J. Mifflin,  (February 6, 1938 – October 5, 2013) was a rear admiral in the Canadian Forces and a politician.

Mifflin was born in Bonavista, Newfoundland, in 1938.

Naval career

Mifflin joined the RCN in 1954 after serving as a Sea Cadet and rose through the ranks as an officer:

 Executive officer  1968–1969
 Command secretary, Maritime Command 1969–1970
 Commanding officer  1970–1972
 Captain, National Defence Headquarters Evaluation Branch 1973–1976
 Commander, First Canadian Destroyer Squadron 1976–1978
 Director of Maritime Requirements 1978–1979
 Director, National Defence Headquarters Secretariat 1979–1981
 Chief of staff, Maritime Command Headquarters, Plans and Ops 1981–1984
 Chief of staff, Maritime Command Headquarters, Personnel 1984–1985
 Rear admiral and deputy commander, Maritime Command 1985–1987

Political career

After retiring from 32 years of service in the Royal Canadian Navy, Mifflin entered politics and was elected to the House of Commons of Canada in the 1988 election. Mifflin became the Liberal Member of Parliament (MP) for the Newfoundland riding of  Bonavista-Trinity-Conception.

After the Liberals came to power under the leadership of Jean Chrétien in the 1993 election, Mifflin was appointed parliamentary secretary to the ministers of national defence and veterans affairs.

In 1996, he was appointed to the Canadian Cabinet as Minister of Fisheries and Oceans. In a 1997 cabinet shuffle, he was appointed Minister of Veterans Affairs and  Secretary of State for the Atlantic Canada Opportunities Agency. Mifflin decided that he wasn't going to run in the next general election, and was dropped from Cabinet in August 1999. He did not run for re-election in the 2000 election.

He supported Stéphane Dion for the leadership of the Liberal Party.  Mifflin died on October 5, 2013, with his wife at his side.

References

External links

1938 births
2013 deaths
Canadian military personnel from Newfoundland and Labrador
Canadian admirals
Liberal Party of Canada MPs
Members of the House of Commons of Canada from Newfoundland and Labrador
Members of the King's Privy Council for Canada
Members of the 26th Canadian Ministry